Saghari Rampur is a village in Aurai block in Muzaffarpur district in the India state of Bihar. It is located about 45 km away from Muzaffarpur, the district headquarters.

 Village name: Saghari Rampur
 Block  name: Aurai
 District name: Muzaffarpur district
 State: Bihar
 Country: India

Villages in Muzaffarpur district